Agbaji is a surname. Notable people with the surname include:

Emmanuel Tony Agbaji (born 1992), Nigerian footballer
Ochai Agbaji (born 2000), American basketball player

Surnames of African origin